Liam Nolan may refer to:

 Liam Nolan (writer), Irish writer and broadcast journalist
 Liam Nolan (footballer), English footballer
 Liam Nolan (Muay Thai), British Muay Thai fighter